The Collison House is a historic house at 260 North Main Street in Bald Knob, Arkansas.  It is a -story brick structure, with a side gable roof.  It is a traditional linear ranch house with Colonial Revival features, including its main entry, which has sidelight windows and a fanlight above.  The house was designed by Estes W. Mann and built in 1950 for Mrs. June Collison.  The house is notable as one of the first ranch houses to be built in its neighborhood.

The house was listed on the National Register of Historic Places in 2008.

See also
National Register of Historic Places listings in White County, Arkansas

References

Houses on the National Register of Historic Places in Arkansas
Houses completed in 1951
Houses in White County, Arkansas
National Register of Historic Places in White County, Arkansas
Buildings and structures in Bald Knob, Arkansas
1951 establishments in Arkansas
Ranch house architecture
Colonial Revival architecture in Arkansas